Kaleigh Rafter (born August 18, 1986) is a Canadian softball player.

Career
Rafter has been part of the national women's team since 2007. Rafter represented her country at the 2008 Summer Olympics in Beijing, China, where the team finished fourth.

Rafter has represented Canada at four Pan American Games: 2007, 2011, 2015 and 2019, winning medals at all four events, including a gold medal in 2015 on home soil. Rafter was named to Canada's 2020 Olympic team in May 2021.

References

1986 births
Canadian softball players
Living people
Sportspeople from Guelph
Olympic softball players of Canada
Softball players at the 2008 Summer Olympics
Softball players at the 2020 Summer Olympics
Softball players at the 2007 Pan American Games
Softball players at the 2011 Pan American Games
Softball players at the 2015 Pan American Games
Softball players at the 2019 Pan American Games
Pan American Games medalists in softball
Pan American Games gold medalists for Canada
Pan American Games silver medalists for Canada
Medalists at the 2020 Summer Olympics
Olympic bronze medalists for Canada
Olympic medalists in softball
Medalists at the 2007 Pan American Games
Medalists at the 2011 Pan American Games
Medalists at the 2015 Pan American Games
Medalists at the 2019 Pan American Games